United Nations Security Council resolution 828, adopted without a vote on 26 May 1993, after examining the application of Eritrea for membership in the United Nations, the Council recommended to the General Assembly that Eritrea be admitted.

See also
 Member states of the United Nations
 List of United Nations Security Council Resolutions 801 to 900 (1993–1994)

References

External links
 
Text of the Resolution at undocs.org

 0828
 0828
 0828
1993 in Eritrea
May 1993 events